Wellington School is a mixed secondary school and sixth form with academy status. It is located in Timperley in the English county of Greater Manchester.

Previously a foundation school administered by Trafford Metropolitan Borough Council, Wellington School converted to academy status on 1 April 2011. However the school continues to coordinate with Trafford Metropolitan Borough Council for admissions, having a non-selective intake.

Wellington School offers GCSEs as programmes of study for pupils, while students in the sixth form have the option to study from a range of A-levels.

Notable former pupils
Bill Speakman VC - recipient of the Victoria Cross
Rob King - Britain's Got Talent semi-finalist

References

External links
Wellington School official website

Secondary schools in Trafford
Academies in Trafford